Turku radio and television station is a mast in Kaarina, Finland.

See also
List of tallest structures in Finland

References

Kaarina
Radio masts and towers in Europe
Communication towers in Finland
Transmitter sites in Finland
Buildings and structures in Southwest Finland
1964 establishments in Finland
Towers completed in 1964